The year 1718 in music involved some significant events.

Events 
Antonio Vivaldi tours Italy.
Handel succeeds Johann Christoph Pepusch as Kapellmeister to the Duke of Chandos.
Johann Joachim Quantz settles in Dresden.
14-year-old Carlos Seixas succeeds his father as organist at Coimbra Cathedral.

Classical music 
Attilio Ariosti – Recueil de pièces
William Babell – The Harpsichord Master Improved
Johann Sebastian Bach  
Lobet den Herrn, alle seine Heerscharen, BWV Anh.5
Herr Christ, der einge Gottessohn, BWV Anh.77
Der Himmel dacht auf Anhalts Ruhm und Glück, BWV 66a
Die Zeit, die Tag und Jahre macht, BWV 134a
Weichet nur, betrübte Schatten, BWV 202
Amore traditore, BWV 203
Vom Himmel hoch, da komm ich her, BWV 738
Violin Concerto in E major, BWV 1042
Concerto for 2 Violins in D minor, BWV 1043
Sinfonia in F major, BWV 1046a
Brandenburg Concerto No. 2 in F major, BWV 1047 (likely composed)
Brandenburg Concerto No. 3 in G major, BWV 1048
Orchestral Suite No. 1 in C major, BWV 1066
 Antonio Caldara – Il martirio di San Terenziano
Pietro Castrucci – 12 Violin Sonatas, Op. 1
Francesco Bartolomeo Conti – Amore in Tessaglia
Jean-François Dandrieu – Les caractères de la guerre
Johann Ernst Prinz von Sachsen-Weimar – 6 Violin Concertos, Op. 1
Christoph Graupner – 8 Partitas
George Frideric Handel  
Esther (oratorio) HWV 50a
Dolc' è pur d'amor l'affanno, HWV 109b
L'aure grate, il fresco rio, HWV 121a
As Pants the Hart, HWV 251b
Francesco Manfredini – 12 Concertos, Op. 3 (inc. No. 12 in C major "Christmas Pastorale")
Pierre Danican Philidor 
4 Suites, Op. 2
3 Suites, Op. 3
 Georg Philipp Telemann 
 6 Suonatine per violino e cembalo (TWV 41)
 6 Trio Sonatas (TWV 42)
 Concerto for 2 Recorders, TWV 52:a2
 Antonio Vivaldi – Qual in pioggia dorata, RV 686
 Giovanni Zamboni – Sonate d'intavolatura di leuto, Op. 1
 Jan Dismas Zelenka 
 Capriccio in G major, ZWV 183
 Capriccio in F major, ZWV 184
 Collectaneorum Musicorum, Book II (compilation of Poglietti and Frescobaldi scores compiled during Zelenka's time in Vienna)

Opera
Toussaint Bertin de la Doué – 
Antonio Maria Bononcini –  Griselda
Giuseppe Antonio Brescianello – Tisbe, Premiered Jan. 26 in Stuttgart
Antonio Caldara – Ifigenia in Aulide
George Frideric Handel – Acis and Galatea HWV 49
Nicola Porpora – Berenice regina d'Egitto
Domenico Natale Sarro – Arsace
Alessandro Scarlatti
Cambise, R.356.64
Il trionfo dell'onore
Telemaco
 Gottfried Heinrich Stölzel – Diomedes (inc. aria "Bist du bei mir", later arranged by J.S. Bach as BWV 508)
Antonio Vivaldi  
Armida al campo d'Egitto, RV 699
Scanderbeg, RV 732
Tito Manlio, RV 738

Theoretical Writings 

 Jean-François Dandrieu – Principes de l'Acompagnement du Clavecin

Births 
January 18 – Christoph Ludwig Fehre, organist and composer (died 1772)
April 14 – Emanuele Barbella, Italian composer and violinist (died 1777)
August 9 – Placidus von Camerloher, German composer (died 1782)
September 25 – Nicola Conforto, composer (died 1793)
November 8 – Joseph Aloys Schmittbaur, composer (died 1809)
November 21 – Friedrich Wilhelm Marpurg, music critic and composer (died 1795)
date unknown 
Wenzel Raimund Birck, composer (died 1763)
Mademoiselle Duval (nom de plume) (died c.1775)
Richard Mudge, composer (died 1763)
Giuseppe Scarlatti (or 1723), composer (died 1777)
December 3 – Richard Duke, violin maker (died 1783)

Deaths 
February 27 – Václav Karel Holan Rovenský, composer (born 1644)
March – Richard Brind, organist and composer
March 13 – Friedrich Nicolaus Brauns, composer (born 1637)
April 1 – Johann Burchard Freystein, hymn writer (born 1671)
November 26 – Bernardo Sabadini, opera composer

References

 
18th century in music
Music by year